Smaragd (II) from the kindred Smaragd (died after 1223) was a Hungarian distinguished nobleman from the gens Smaragd, who held several positions during the reign of Andrew II of Hungary.

Family
His father was ispán (comes) Smaragd I (d. after 1167). He moved to the Kingdom of Hungary from Champagne, France. Smaragd II had a brother, Egidius (or Giles). Together with him, Smaragd built the Premontre monastery church of Zsámbék around 1220. During the foundation, Smaragd donated his estates Szentkirály (within Esztergom), Marót, Perbál, Répás (today a borough of Sajópálfala), Szörény, Zsámbék, Ság, Seregélyes and Szerdahely to the monastery. Egidius and Smaragd possibly also had another brother Paul.

Smaragd had three children, one of them was Smaragd III, archbishop of Kalocsa. Aynard I served as ispán of Valkó County from 1244 to 1246, while Gilét I was count of the tárnoks ("comes udvornicorum"). Both of them belonged to the retinue of Queen Maria Laskarina, wife of Béla IV of Hungary. They were the ancestors of the Ajnárdfi and Zsámboki (Gilétfi) noble families, respectively.

Career
Smaragd served as judge royal (iudex curiae) between 1205 and 1206. Besides that he was the ispán of Szolnok County. After that he was appointed voivode of Transylvania in 1206. According to László Markó he also held that office until 1207. Smaragd owned Szeghalom and Csökmő in 1208, according to a contemporary document.

Between 1208 and 1209, he functioned as ispán of Bihar County. He served as ispán of Szolnok County for the second time in 1213. He was the ispán of Pozsony County from 1214 to 1222. He participated in Andrew II's Fifth Crusade between 1217 and 1218. Smaragd served as ispán of Bács County at the end of 1222.

References

Sources

 
 
 
 

Smaragd II
Judges royal
Voivodes of Transylvania
Christians of the Fifth Crusade
Hungarian people of French descent
12th-century Hungarian people
13th-century Hungarian people